The men's C-2 1000 metres event was an open-style, pairs canoeing event conducted as part of the Canoeing at the 1972 Summer Olympics program.

Medalists

Results

Heats
The 16 teams first raced in two heats on September 5. The top three finishers from each of the heats advanced directly to the semifinals and the remaining ten teams were relegated to the repechages.

Repechages
Taking place on September 7, the top three finishers from each of the repechages advanced to the semifinals.

Semifinals
Three semifinals were held on September 8. The top three finishers from each of the semifinals advanced to the final.

Final
The final was held on September 9.

The Soviets took an early lead, but the Romanians mounted a charge at the 700 meter mark which came up 0.03 seconds short at the finish.

References
1972 Summer Olympics official report Volume 3. pp. 494–5. 
Sports-reference.com 1972 C-2 1000 m results.
Wallechinsky, David and Jaime Loucky (2008). "Canoeing: Men's Canadian Pair 1000 Meters". In The Complete Book of the Olympics: 2008 Edition. London: Aurum Press Limited. p. 483.

Men's C-2 1000
Men's events at the 1972 Summer Olympics